Aslan Usoyan (27 February 1937 – 16 January 2013), also known as Baba Gurgur and Grandpa Hassan ( Ded Hasan) or just Grandpa, was a mafia boss, an ethnic Kurdish mobster and thief in law, who began his career operating in Georgia and Kurdistan, continued in Moscow, Ural, Siberia, Uzbekistan, Krasnodar, Sochi, and other parts of the former Soviet Union. According to The Economist, he was "reputed to be Russia's mafia boss".

Criminal acts
Starting in 2007, Usoyan was embroiled in a gang war with Georgian mobster Tariel Oniani, who was seeking to reestablish himself in Moscow. Several of Usoyan's top lieutenants were killed including the Armenian national Alek Minalyan, a man allegedly in charge of extorting construction firms working on the 2014 Winter Olympics. In July 2008 police raided Oniani's yacht as a meeting took place amongst the criminal leaders in an attempt to settle the conflict. Usoyan was not however amongst those detained. He later gave an interview to a newspaper, denying the stories of escalating violence and stated that "We are a peaceful people and don't bother anybody, we are for peace in order to prevent lawlessness".

Vyacheslav Ivankov was brought in to mediate the conflict, in which he sided with Usoyan's faction. He was however shot by a sniper while leaving a Moscow restaurant in July 2009, and died of his wounds in October that year. Although he did not attend, Usoyan sent an elaborate wreath to Ivankov's funeral saying "To our brother from Grandpa Hassan".

In April 2010, Usoyan was arrested by Ukrainian security forces after entering the country illegally using false documents. His business in Ukraine was allegedly connected to a rift with an Armenian organized crime group. On 16 September 2010, Usoyan was shot by a 9 mm calibre bullet fired by an unidentified assailant in central Moscow, but survived the attack along with his bodyguard who was also wounded. It was at first announced to the press that Usoyan had died to ensure his safety.

In the early 2010s the Obama administration placed sanctions on members of the alleged criminal organisation the Brothers' Circle. It has been speculated that the so-called circle is a stand-in for Usoyan's network.

Alleged ties to PKK
It was assumed that Usoyan, an ethnic Kurd, was one of the weapon suppliers to the Kurdistan Workers' Party (PKK) that is fighting an armed struggle against the Turkish state for an autonomous Kurdistan and cultural and political rights for the Kurds in Turkey.

Death
On 16 January 2013 and a month before his 76th birthday, Usoyan was shot in the head by a sniper perched on the sixth floor of an adjacent apartment building after leaving a restaurant which served as his office, and despite efforts of his bodyguards and ambulance workers he died en route to the hospital. The family decided to fly Usoyan's body to be buried in his native Tbilisi, but the Tbilisi International Airport refused to accept the plane. His death was thought to be likely to spur chaos in the criminal world. The day Usoyan was shot dead, an Armenian crime fiction writer, Sergey Galoyan, said in a conversation with a local news website that the mafia king's murder might be linked to a certain unrest in the criminal world, particularly the construction of the Sochi Olympic facilities which are said to have attracted considerable investments.

The main suspects behind Usoyan's murder are Tariel Oniani and Rovshan Janiev.

See also 

 Tamaz Somkhishvili
 Zakhariy Kalashov

References

1937 births
2013 deaths
Thieves in law
Yazidis from Georgia (country)
Russian Yazidis
Russian people of Kurdish descent
Soviet Kurdish people
Kurdish criminals
Russian crime bosses
Russian gangsters
Murdered Russian gangsters
Gangsters from Georgia (country)
Criminals from Tbilisi
Deaths by firearm in Russia
People murdered in Russia